Canadian singer Céline Dion has embarked on 15 concert tours and 2 concert residencies throughout her career. Regarded as the "Priestess of Pop", Dion has performed to 808 concert tour shows and 1,141 residency shows from 1990-2020 span. As of July 2022, Dion has grossed $1.35 billion and has sold over 10.9 million tickets worldwide, making her the third highest grossing solo act of all time, second by female artist and sixth overall. According to Pollstar, Dion is the second highest grossing female artists this century (2000-2020), with 1.18 billion gross and over 8.2 million tickets sold worldwide. Billboard ranked Dion as the sixth highest grossing female artist of 2010s decade (21st overall).

According to Billboard Boxscore, Dion's concerts have grossed over $1.115 billion as of November 2019. According to Billboard Boxscore, She is one of only eight artists to cross the billion-mark in history. Taking Chances World Tour is listed as the fourth highest grossing tour by a female artist in history with $279.2 million. It made Dion become the highest grossing performer for three venues: Montreal's Bell Centre, Kansas City's Sprint Center, and the New Orleans Arena. In Ireland, over 64,000 tickets for her Dublin concert, the largest single concert of the scheduled tour, were sold out in 3 hours.

Céline Dion Live 2017 is a concert tour with 25 shows. It broke many records including "the highest grossing artist at each UK venue where she performed". John Meglen, president and co-CEO, Concerts West commended this remarkable achievement calling her: "the voice of our lifetime". Céline Dion Live 2018 is a concert tour that visited Asia & Oceania for the first time since 2008. The biggest engagement of the tour was a three-night stay at Taiwan's Taipei Arena, where over 300,000 Taiwanese fans clambered for the 20,000 tickets available for Celine Dion's first-ever concerts in Taipei. The tour earned a nomination at the Helpmann Awards, for Best International Contemporary Concert. Courage World Tour is her first world tour in over a decade since 2008. In Paris, all general public tickets (200,000) available for her 6 concert shows at Paris La Défense Arena were sold out immediately in just 90 minutes. Despite being postponed due to the pandemic, it has grossed $104 million in just 52 shows.

With $354.98 ticket average price, Dion is ranked as the 2nd most expensive music act to see live.

90s

Dion's most successful tour during the nineties was Lets Talk About Love World Tour. It has grossed $208.8 million (gross adjusted for inflation) across 97 shows and is listed as one of the highest grossing tours of the decade and of all time. It visited some of the biggest stadiums across Europe including: Netherlands (64,600), Belgium (59,800), France (90,000), Switzerland (42,000), Germany (57,400), Scotland (53,000) & UK (62,000). Dion made music history with her two consecutive sold-out concerts in France, becoming the first artist in history to perform for more than 90,000 spectators, with a grand total of 180,000 ticketholders over the two nights at Stade de France.

Year-End placements

Céline Dion on the "Highest Grossing Artists list of each respective years" (in both female & overall list including the revenue gross).

By the end of the 2010s decade, Céline Dion was nominated in the category "Pop Touring Artist of the Decade" at the 32nd Annual Pollstar Awards.

According to Los Angeles Times, Dion was the Top Earning Artist of the 2000s Decade with $747.9 million throughout the decade ($522.2 million of which came from concerts).

Concert tours

Concert residencies

According to Billboard, two of her recent residencies, A New Day (2003–07) and Celine (2011-19), combined to gross $681.3 million and sell 4,555,752 tickets, according to figures reported to Billboard Boxscore. They altogether occupy the top two highest-grossing and best-selling Las Vegas residencies of all time. According to Randy Phillips (President/CEO of AEG Live): "Céline Dion at the Colosseum is one of the most successful live-event endeavors ever taken".

Other concerts

Other articles on appearances

See also
 List of highest-grossing concert tours
 List of highest-grossing live music artists

References

 
Dion, Celine